Fork–join may refer to:

 Fork–join model, a programming style in parallel computing
 Fork–join queue, in probability theory